Dr.V. R. Lalithambika (born 1962) is an Indian engineer and scientist who has been working with the Indian Space Research Organisation (ISRO). She is a specialist in Advanced Launcher Technologies and was leading the Gaganyaan mission to send Indian astronauts to space by 2022.

Early life 
Lalithambika was born in 1962 in Thiruvananthapuram, Kerala, India. The proximity of her house to the Thumba rocket testing centre got her fascinated towards ISRO, right from her childhood. Her exposure to science started very early primarily because of her grandfather, who used to make gadgets like lenses, microscopes, etc at the house itself and also kept her updated about ISRO’s work. Her grandfather was a mathematician, an astronomer, and a gadget-maker. Her father was also an engineer.

She studied B. Tech. in Electrical Engineering from  College of Engineering, Trivandrum and later pursued her M. Tech. in Control Engineering also from College of Engineering, Trivandrum. She worked with two colleges before joining ISRO. She did her Ph. D. while working with ISRO.

Career
She is a specialist of Advanced Launch Vehicle Technology. She had joined Vikram Sarabhai Space Centre (VSSC), Thiruvananthapuram. in 1988. She led a team which designed rocket control and guidance systems. She has worked with various ISRO rockets including the Augmented Satellite Launch Vehicle (ASLV), Polar Satellite Launch Vehicle (PSLV) and Geosynchronous Satellite Launch Vehicle (GSLV) and Reusable Launch Vehicle (RLV). She has been a part of over 100 space missions.

Before moving to ISRO headquarters in Bengaluru, she was the Deputy Director (control, guidance and simulation) at VSSC, Thiruvananthapuram. She will lead the Gaganyaan mission as the Director of the Indian Human Spaceflight Programme which is intended to send Indian astronauts in the space by 2022.

Awards
She was awarded the Space Gold Medal (2001), ISRO Individual Merit Award and ISRO Performance Excellence Award (2013). She has also won Astronautical Society of India award for excellence in launch vehicle technology.

Personal life
Her husband Pradeep Kumar A.B. is currently the Chairman of Kerala State Pollution Control Board.

References

1962 births
Indian women engineers
20th-century Indian women scientists
Engineers from Kerala
Scientists from Kerala
21st-century Indian women scientists
21st-century Indian scientists
20th-century Indian engineers
Living people
20th-century women engineers
21st-century women engineers